Gachlu (also Romanized as Gachlū and Gachalū; also known as Gecherlū, Kachalū, and Kechalu) is a village in Hendudur Rural District, Sarband District, Shazand County, Markazi Province, Iran. At the 2006 census, its population was 169, in 35 families.

References 

Populated places in Shazand County